Yuri Fedorovych Lysianskyi (also spelled as Urey Lisiansky and Lisianski and Lysyansky) (1(13) April 1773 – 6 March 1837) was an officer in the Imperial Russian Navy and explorer. He was an ethnic Ukrainian and headed the first Russian circumnavigation aboard the Neva and was among the early western explorers to visit Easter Island. Several places are named after him.

Biography 
Lysiansky was born in Nizhyn (Hetmanate, now Ukraine, then Russian Empire) in the family of the orthodox priest and was a descendant of old Cossack family. In 1786 he graduated from the Navy Cadet Corps and took part in the Russo-Swedish War (1788-1790). During 1790-1793 he served in the Baltic Fleet. During 1793-1799 he sailed British ships all over the globe. Between 1793 and 1795 he served as a volunteer aboard the 36-gun HMS Oiseau, under her captain, Robert Murray. Lysiansky recalled in his memoirs his experiences on the North American Station operating against French convoys and privateers, and how while in the West Indies he was struck by yellow fever, recalling how Murray had helped his recovery, even giving up part of his own accommodation for the sick Lysiansky. Lysiansky was the first Ukrainian who in 1795 had an audience with the first President and founder of the USA, George Washington. 

In 1803–1806 Lysiansky as the commanding officer of the Russian-American Company's merchant sloop Neva took part in the first Russian circumnavigation of the Earth. The expedition was under the command of Count Nikolay Petrovich Rezanov, Plenipotentiary of Alexander I for the Far Eastern and Western colonies of the Russian Empire, and Captain Adam Johann von Krusenstern in Nadezhda. The ships also included a naturalist, Wilhelm Gottlieb Tilesius, and astronomer Johan Caspar Horner (1734-1834). They started from Kronstadt, but the ships split after visiting Hawaii, and Count Nikolay Rezanov and Lysiansky headed to Russian America (Alaska). In 1804 Neva visited Easter Island, and later that year, was essential in defeating the Tlingit in the Battle of Sitka, Alaska. During his stay in Alaska, Lysiansky mapped its coast, the islands of Kodiak and Sitka, and left its geographical and ethnographic descriptions. He collected a unique ethnographic collection that tells about the life and culture of local peoples - Aleuts, Eskimos and Tlingit. He criticized the Russian colonial government for mercilessly oppressing and abusing the indigenous peoples of America. In 1805 he met Krusenstern again in Macau, but they soon separated. Also in 1805, he was the first to describe the Hawaiian monk seal on the island which now bears his name - Lisianski Island. Eventually, Neva was the first to return to Kronstadt on 22 July 1806. For his feats Lysiansky received several rewards, including the Order of Saint Vladimir of 3rd degree. He described his own adventures and travels in the book Voyage Round the World with maps and drawings, which he published in Russian and English in 1812-1814.

Lysiansky was buried at Tikhvin Cemetery of the Alexander Nevsky Monastery, St. Petersburg.

Memorials
A number of places are named after him: Lisianski Island in the Northwestern Hawaiian Islands, a peninsula of Baranof Island, Alaska, a bay, a strait, a river, and a cape in North America, an undersea mountain in Okhotsk Sea, and a peninsula by the Okhotsk Sea. There is monument and Memorial museum of U.Lysianskyi in Ukrainian town of Nizhyn.

Citations

References

 Naming of Alaska

1773 births
1837 deaths
People from Nizhyn
Ukrainian military personnel
Circumnavigators of the globe
Explorers from the Russian Empire
Ukrainian explorers
Imperial Russian Navy personnel
Russian explorers of the Pacific
Russian America
Russian people of Ukrainian descent
Recipients of the Order of St. Vladimir, 3rd class
Burials at Tikhvin Cemetery
Naval Cadet Corps alumni